A video projector is an image projector that receives a video signal and projects the corresponding image on a projection screen using a lens system. Video projectors use a very bright ultra-high-performance lamp (a special mercury arc lamp), Xenon arc lamp, LED or solid state blue, RB, RGB or remote fiber optic RGB lasers to provide the illumination required to project the image, and most modern ones can correct any curves, blurriness, and other inconsistencies through manual settings. If a blue laser is used, a phosphor wheel is used to turn blue light into white light, which is also the case with white LEDs. (White LEDs do not use lasers.) A wheel is used in order to prolong the lifespan of the phosphor, as it is degraded by the heat generated by the laser diode. Remote fiber optic RGB laser racks can be placed far away from the projector, and several racks can be housed in a single, central room. Each projector can use up to two racks, and several monochrome lasers are mounted on each rack, the light of which is mixed and transmitted to the projector booth using optical fibers. Projectors using RB lasers use a blue laser with a phosphor wheel in conjunction with a conventional solid state red laser.

Video projectors are used for many applications such as conference room presentations, classroom training, home cinema, movie theaters and concerts, having mostly replaced overhead, slide and conventional film projectors. In schools and other educational settings, they are sometimes connected to an interactive whiteboard. In the late 20th century, they became commonplace in home cinema. Although large LCD television screens became quite popular, video projectors are still common among many home theater enthusiasts.

Overview
A video projector, also known as a digital projector, may project onto a traditional reflective projection screen, or it may be built into a cabinet with a translucent rear-projection screen to form a single unified display device.

Common display resolutions  include SVGA (800×600 pixels), XGA (1024×768 pixels), SXGA+ (1400x1050 pixels), 720p (1280×720 pixels), and 1080p (1920×1080 pixels), 4K UHD (3840x2160), as well as 16:10 aspect ratio resolutions including WXGA+ (1280x800 pixels) and WUXGA (1920x1200 pixels)

The cost of a projector is typically driven by its base technology, features, resolution, and light output. A projector with a higher light output (measured in lumens, “lm”) is required for a larger screen or for a room with a larger amount of ambient light. For example, a light output of approximately 1500 to 2500 ANSI lumens is suitable for small screens viewed in rooms with low ambient light; approximately 2500 to 4000 lm is suitable for medium-sized screens with some ambient light; over 4000 lm is needed for very large screens or for use in rooms with no lighting control such as conference rooms. High brightness large-venue models are increasingly common in Boardrooms, Auditoriums and other high profile spaces, and models up to 30,000 lm are used in large staging applications such as concerts, keynote addresses and displays projected on buildings.

A few camcorders have a built-in projector suitable to make a small projection; a few more powerful "pico projectors" are pocket-sized, and many projectors are portable.

Projection technologies

LCD projector using LCD light gates. This is the simplest system, making it one of the most common and affordable for home theaters and business use. Common problems include a visible “screen door” or pixelation effect, and the LCD panels deteriorating from heat & UV rays, leading to discolored spots or holes in the image, although recent advances have reduced the severity of these issues in some models.
DLP projector using Texas Instruments’ DLP technology. This uses one, two, or three microfabricated light valves called digital micromirror devices (DMDs). The single- and double-DMD versions use rotating color wheels in time with the mirror refreshes to modulate color. The most common problem with the single- or two-DMD varieties is a visible “rainbow” which some people perceive when moving their eyes. More recent projectors with higher speed (2x or 4x) and otherwise optimised color wheels have lessened this effect. 3-chip DLP projectors do not have this problem, as they display each primary color simultaneously, and offer higher light output and more accurate color reproduction, however the cost is significantly higher and thus 3-chip DLP technology is typically used in large venue, high brightness models, as well as Digital Cinema projectors.
LCoS projectors (liquid crystal on silicon). Such projectors often process light in the Fourier domain, which enables correction of optical aberrations using Zernike polynomials.  Some commercially available technologies include:
D-ILA JVC’s Direct-drive Image Light Amplifier based on LCoS technology.
SXRD Sony’s proprietary variant of LCoS technology.
LED projectors use one of the above-mentioned technologies for image creation, with a difference that they use an array of Light Emitting Diodes as the light source, negating the need for lamp replacement.
Hybrid LED and laser diode system developed by Casio. Uses a combination of Light Emitting Diodes and 445 nm laser diodes as the light source, while image is processed with DLP (DMD) chip.
Laser diode projectors have been developed by Microvision and Aaxa Technologies. Microvision projectors use Microvision's patented MEMS laser beam-steering technology, whereas Aaxa Technologies uses laser diodes + LCoS.
Laser projectors are now available from most projector manufacturers, including Barco, Canon, Christie Digital, Dell, Epson, Hitachi, NEC, Optoma, Panasonic, Sony, Viewsonic and many others. These units use a laser light source (instead of conventional lamps), and are used with most common projection technologies, including single & 3-Chip DLP, LCD and LCoS.  They offer numerous advantages, including eliminating the high cost and downtime of replacing lamps, variations in brightness and color that occur as lamps age and improved color fidelity.  Typical laser light sources used in projectors are rated for 20,000 hours before the light output is reduced to 50%, whereas lamps lose brightness quickly and need to be replaced after as little as 1000–2000 hours.

Obsolete technologies
CRT projector using cathode ray tubes. Once dominated the video projection market, but given their limited light output, size, weight, and need for complex alignment, they have since been displaced by digital projectors and are no longer being made
Eidophor oil-film projectors
LIA (light image amplifier) light valves
Schmidt-CRT, developed by Kloss Video
Talaria oil-film projectors

Do-it-yourself video projectors 
Some hobbyists build a do-it-yourself (DIY) projector for low cost.  They build their projectors from kits, sourced components, or from scratch, using a television set as a light source.  Through the internet, they obtain plans to construct them for domestic and classroom use.

See also
3LCD
Comparison of display technology
Digital cinema
Digital divide
Digital Light Processing (DLP)
Handheld projector
Inflatable movie screen
Large-screen television technology
Live event support
Projection screen
Project Ariana
Projector (disambiguation)
Screen door effect
Video designer

References

Digital technology
Display devices
Home video
Office equipment
Projectors
Television terminology
Video hardware